A Cruyff Court is a small football field with a surface made of artificial grass, a contemporary version of the ball court. The Courts are a project of the Johan Cruyff Foundation of which Johan Cruijff himself was one of the founders. The first was the  Cruyff Court Aron Winter Veld in Lelystad. Since 2003, the Dutch football Talent of the Year may choose a location for a new court.

Although primarily focused on football, the Foundation considers it a plus if other sports and games take place. Furthermore, the normal Cruyff Court is expressly intended as a neighborhood facility: the application is asked for embedding in the neighborhood. This embedding also applies as much as possible to the adjusted Cruyff Courts, but they are set up in consultation with an institution for young people with a disability.

Characteristics
A Cruyff Court is typically placed in Dutch neighborhoods with a commitment to sport and recreation. The field is typically 42×28 meters and much smaller than a regular size football field. As a comparison, the penalty area of a UEFA Champions League pitch is 40×16,5 meters. Both in width and length a regular size pitch is 2,5 times larger and 6x the size in surface. The courts are green, except for the circle in the middle, which is dark yellow and purple and the orange CCKV logo. The goals are orange and the fences are blue.

The Johan Cruyff Foundation regards the social embedding as an essential part of the courts. For this reason, benches are required along the edge of the field, and fences must occur with nearby residents. Furthermore, public support and the need for a great deal of attention are given in the checklist that aspiring municipalities must complete. Among other things, it asks about the background of the neighborhood, supervision, the proximity of schools and multicultural composition, other sports facilities and also about disadvantage characteristics of the neighborhood. The first question of the checklist: is the location in the middle of the neighborhood?Cruyff Court Quickscan.doc, downloadable from contactpage| retrieved July 7, 2008

History
In 2003 the first Cruyff Courts were constructed and at the end of 2007; there were 70. In 2016 there are 208 of which 35 abroad and 33 locally. Countries outside the Netherlands with a Cruyff Court include Belgium, Spain, Poland, Great Britain, Morocco, the United States and Japan.

Special fields

Madurodam 
Special is the 'Madurodam Field' 'in The Hague, not only because there is a miniature version of it, but also because it is combined with the Playground of the Richard Krajicek realized Richard Krajicek Foundation. It is part of a sports complex, and schools in the area take part in the activities.

Youth with a disability 
Included with the 208 Cruyff Courts are 33 adapted fields for youth with a disability. These are located at rehabilitation centers and special schools and are adapted to the user group. To adapt to the special wishes of the institutions, a collaboration has started with the Rietveld Academy; From mid-2008, students can offer inventive solutions for adapted courts.

Playground Almere
The FC Omniworld Veld in Almere city, is one of the most visited spots of the Johan Cruyff Foundation. This is of course due to the fact that it is part of one big playground: "The Clarence Seedorf Square", which includes 2 basketball, 3 tennis, boules, and 2 football fields. Thanks to the continuous presence of sports and youth workers, Europe's biggest playground is one of the most successful playgrounds.

Bartiméus
On May 22, 2007 Cruyff Court Oranje Veld Zeist was opened at Bartiméus, a living, learning and working community for visually impaired. This was the first custom field, but it is accessible to everyone in Zeist. This court has extra lines for goalball, a throwing game played with a rumble ball. Furthermore, contrasting colors have been used: the outlet room and the fences are blue and the lines yellow. For the goal ball, goals can be placed along the long sides.

Financing and realization

Compulsory partners 
Thanks to the Hattrick Program of the UEFA the CCKV could be set up. Hattrick makes money available to the national football associations for the construction of synthetic turf pitches. Where a field is desired, the municipality assigns possible locations, a checklist of pros and cons, and declarations of intent from BVOs or football clubs.

Other regular partners:
 Koninklijke Ten Cate for the synthetic turf.
 Netherlands Institute for Sports and Exercise (NISB) for project management.
 Research and inspection company ISA Sport for the technical quality of the field.
 W.J.H. Mulierinstituut for long-term research into the influence of the courts on the living environment in the neighborhood.

Other partners 
After fields in Amsterdam, Eindhoven and Rotterdam, the Oranje Veld Zeist is the fourth to be donated by the Netherlands National Team. The indication Oranje refers to it, as the name  Aron Winter Field  refers to the sponsor of that field in residential and/or birthplace Lelystad. Dennis Bergkamp had at the end of his career a site in the London district Islington.

Each Dutch Talent of the Year can designate a location for a new field. Arjen Robben, Klaas-Jan Huntelaar and Wesley Sneijder chose their birthplaces Bedum, Hummelo and Utrecht. In 2008 the "Ibrahim Afellay Field" "will be created in Al Hoceima, Morocco, where his family has always lived. Cooperation with the Stichting MaroquiStars has been sought for this.

Another 22 courts are largely donated by clubs from professional football and are in their playing city. In total, at least 32 fields are financed by professional football. If in the name only a city or district is mentioned, then the municipality is usually one of the biggest donors.

References

External links
 Cruyff Courts 
 Central Bureau Fundraising about Johan Cruyff Foundation 

Johan Cruyff
Outdoor recreation in the Netherlands
Playgrounds
Street football